Twenty First Century Skin is the fourth studio album by Praga Khan. It was released in 1999.

Track listing
 "Breakfast in Vegas" – 6:09	
 "Isolation" – 5:41	
 "Visions & Imaginations" – 4:15	
 "Far Beyond the Sun" – 5:26	
 "What's Wrong With Me" – 4:14	
 "Lonely" – 5:33	
 "Supersonic Lovetoy" – 3:23	
 "Lady Alcohol" – 4:25	
 "Bored Out of My Mind" – 4:47	
 "Begin to Move" – 6:08	
 "One Foot in the Grave" – 4:09	
 "Adult Entertainment" – 3:34

Notes

1999 albums
Praga Khan albums